First Cabinet of Mateusz Morawiecki formed the previous government of Poland between 2017 and 2019, following Szydło's cabinet. Governing during the 8th legislature of the Sejm and the 9th legislature of the Senate, it was led by Prime Minister Mateusz Morawiecki.

Members of the Council of Ministers

Policy

History Law
In early 2018, both chambers of the Polish parliament (the Sejm and Senate) adopted an Amendment to the Act on the Institute of National Remembrance criminalising the ascription to Poles collectively of complicity in World War II Jewish-genocide-related or other war crimes or crimes against humanity that had been committed by the Axis powers, and condemning use of the expression, "Polish death camp". The law sparked a crisis in Israel–Poland relations.

Social
In March 2018 a new Polish law took effect, banning nearly all commerce on Sundays, with supermarkets and most other retailers closed Sundays for the first time since liberal shopping laws were introduced in the 1990s. The law had been passed by the Law and Justice party with Morawiecki's support. The Bill had the support of Solidarity which In 2017, backed a proposal to implement blue laws to prohibit Sunday shopping, a move supported by Polish bishops.

External links

 Government composition

References

Polish government cabinets
History of Poland (1989–present)
Law and Justice
2017 establishments in Poland
Cabinets established in 2017